Maiden Erlegh Lakes is a   Local Nature Reserve Earley, a suburb of Reading in Berkshire. It is owned and managed by Earley Town Council.

Geography and site

The nature reserve consists of areas of ancient and secondary woodland, grassland, a large lake, a brook, an old woodland pond and surrounding wetland habitat. The reserve supports a large amount of wildlife including over a 100 species of butterflies and moths, more than 50 species of birds, 50 species of fungi and over 20 species of trees. The site features a lake which is 2.4 hectares in area and up to 2 meters deep. The lake features two islands, which birds use as nesting places.

The reserve features woodlands that contain a small pond which is the last remaining remnant of a second lake that used to occupy much of this copse area. On the south side of the lake is more woodland, plus a wildflower meadow and butterfly garden.

Features

On the island within the lake known as Swan Island a statue made out of a tree that had fallen in 2007 was revealed to the public in 2009.

History

The area of the reserve called Oak Wood dates from at least the 16th century and contains some 18 indicator species associated with old woodlands. The lake area which was once a wet woodland is believed to have been created, by damming the area, sometime between the Middle Ages to the 18th century to create fishponds, provide ice and create a landscape feature.

In the late 18th century, Maiden Erlegh was owned by slaveholder and MP William Mathew Burt, who recruited Capability Brown to assist with landscape planning.

The 1820 maps of enclosures and the tithe map of 1844 both show the woodlands and lake, within Maiden Erlegh Park, as being almost the same size and shape as today.

The lake and surrounding site was purchased by Solomon Joel in 1903, where it is believed he had the larger of the two islands in the lake created.

In response to the demands of local residents Coopers Estates agreed to sell Maiden Erlegh Lake and the surrounding woodland to Earley Parish Council in return for being allowed to build on another greenfield site in 1965 for a sum of £8,500. The land sold in 1965 consisted of the lake itself, plus Oakwood, Old Pond Copse and a small part of Moor Copse. In 1991 Old Lane Wood was acquired from Wokingham Borough Council for £1.

In 1996 the area was then declared a local nature reserve by Earley Town Council.

Fauna

The site has the following fauna:

Reptiles and amphibians

Invertebrates

Birds

Mammals

Fish

Flora

The site has the following flora:

Trees

Plants

References

Parks and open spaces in Berkshire
Nature reserves in Berkshire
Local Nature Reserves in Berkshire